Rachel Marcus is a Canadian actress and voice artist best known for her role as Beatrice 'Booky' Thomson in Booky and the Secret Santa (2007) and Booky's Crush (2009).

Career
Marcus' first acting job, apart from school plays, was when at the age of 10 years she landed the starring role of Beatrice 'Booky' Thomson in Booky and the Secret Santa, a made for TV film based upon the novel series by Bernice Thurman Hunter.  For her performance as Booky, Marcus received a 2008 Gemini Awards nomination.  Her second starring film role was a year later when she reprised her role as Booky for Booky's Crush, for which she received another Gemini Awards nomination.  In 2008, she joined the cast of Stoked which premiered on June 25, 2009 on Teletoon.  From 2011 to 2015, she voiced Stella in the animated series Stella and Sam.

Filmography

Recognition

Awards and nominations

 2008, Gemini Awards nomination for 'Best Performance by an Actress in a Leading Role in a Dramatic Program or Mini-Series' for Booky and the Secret Santa
 2009, Gemini Awards nomination for 'Best Performance by an Actress in a Leading Role in a Dramatic Program or Mini-Series' for Booky's Crush

References

External links
 

Canadian child actresses
Canadian voice actresses
Living people
Year of birth missing (living people)
Canadian television actresses
21st-century Canadian actresses